Daqiao Township is a township of Weishi County in north-central Henan province, China, located adjacent to and southwest of the county seat. , it has 30 villages under its administration.

See also 
 List of township-level divisions of Henan

References 

Township-level divisions of Henan
Weishi County